Bob Hager may refer to:

 Robert Hager, analyst and former correspondent for the US television network NBC News
 Bob Hager (politician) (born 1961), Republican party member of the Iowa House of Representatives
 Bob Hager (coach), head coach of varsity men's basketball at Oregon Agricultural College, today's Oregon State University, until the 1928–29 season